Robert Outterside  (6 March 1932 - 8 August 2022) was a rugby union player who represented Australia.

Outterside, a number 8, was born in Sydney and played two international rugby matches for Australia.

Away from football, Outterside was also a successful teacher and school administrator, rising to become Headmaster of Sydney Boys High School. In 1990 he was appointed an Officer of the Order of Australia (AO) for service to education.

References

Australian rugby union players
Australia international rugby union players
1932 births
Living people
Officers of the Order of Australia
Rugby union players from Sydney
Rugby union number eights